Philippe Le Guillou is a French writer. He was born in Finistère in 1959. A prolific writer, he has published around 40 books, including fiction and non-fiction. He won the Prix Médicis for Les Sept Noms du peintre and the Prix Mediterranee for La Rumeur du soleil.

Reference

French writers
1959 births
Living people
Prix Médicis winners
Rennes 2 University alumni
People from Finistère